Spyridium nitidum, commonly known as shining spyridium, is a species of flowering plant in the family Rhamnaceae and is endemic to south-eastern continental Australia. It is an erect, spindly shrub with narrowly elliptic or narrowly egg-shaped leaves with the narrower end towards the base, and heads of hairy, woolly white flowers.

Description

Taxonomy
Spyridium nitidum was first formally described in 1957 by Norman Arthur Wakefield in The Victorian Naturalist. The specific epithet (nitidum) means "shining".

Distribution
Shining spyridium grows in south-eastern South Australia, including on the Eyre Peninsula and Kangaroo Island, and in the Big Desert area of Victoria, near the border with South Australia.

References

nitidum
Rosales of Australia
Flora of South Australia
Flora of Victoria (Australia)
Plants described in 1957
Taxa named by Norman Arthur Wakefield